Eastergate is a village and former civil parish, now in the parish of Barnham and Eastergate, in the Arun district of West Sussex, England. It is located five miles (8 km) east of Chichester. The civil parish covered an area of 370ha (of which 200ha is owned by the farm) and had a population of 3107 persons according to the 2001 census. At the 2011 Census the population was 3,417. On 1 April 2019 the parish was merged with Barnham to form "Barnham and Eastergate".

Roman remains have been found near St George's Church, although until the 20th century the village remained a small one. The area, being on alluvium, was principally used for market gardens. Subsequent house building has resulted in a large increase in population.

As Gate, the settlement was listed in the 1086 Domesday Book as having 28 households, plough lands, woodlands, meadows and a church, with an annual value of £4.

John Ireland (1879–1962) often stayed in the parish, and named a hymn tune after it.

Barnham railway station (which was actually within Eastergate parish) was opened in 1864 and lies on the West Coastway Line.  The station was called Barnham Junction until 1929 because the branch line to Bognor Regis leaves the main line here. East and West Coastway (to Brighton in the East and Portsmouth or Southampton in the West) and London services are operated by Southern, with occasional First Great Western services travelling as far afield as Great Malvern and Cardiff.

References

External links

Eastergate history
Eastergate Parish Council

Villages in West Sussex
Former civil parishes in West Sussex
Arun District